Managers in Partnership (MIP) is a British Trades Union for healthcare managers. It was launched in 2005 as a joint venture by UNISON, the largest public service union, and FDA, the specialist management union.

It started with started with 4,000 members, three-quarters inherited from Unison, the rest from the FDA's health section and in 2015 has about 6,000 members, including 200 chief executives, most of which are employed in the National Health Service. It has a management board, which is made up of senior paid and lay officials from Unison and FDA.  The chief executive is Jon Restell.  It holds an annual national conference.

One of the main issues it faces is the poor image of NHS managers.  There were also problems with NHS managers being in the same union, the FDA, as their bosses in Whitehall.  The union does not have any branches, and it does not negotiate collectively.  Its chief function is to provide support and protection for individual managers.

In the 2015 NHS pay negotiations it urged its members to reject the government's pay deal because it was unfair in targeting senior staff while leaving the pay of doctors “untouched”. It also said the offer undermined Agenda for Change.

References

External links
 MiP website

Trade unions in the United Kingdom
Public sector trade unions